All In: The Education of General David Petraeus is the biography of David Petraeus, written by co-authors Paula Broadwell and Vernon Loeb.  The books were released on Tuesday, Jan. 24, 2012, it reached No. 33 on The New York Times Best Seller list in 2012.

Reviews
Doris Kearns Goodwin referred to it as a "majestic biography."  Tom Brokaw described it as a "riveting insider's account."
Foreign Policy magazine described it as a "best read of 2012."  Other sources described the book as "hagiographic," with author Max Boot saying he would have liked to have seen "a more objective" portrait of Petraeus presented.

Broadwell-Petraeus affair

On November 9, 2012, Petraeus resigned as Director of the CIA after an FBI investigation showed that he and Broadwell were engaged in an extramarital affair, which some have claimed constituted a potential national security risk due to the classified information Broadwell gained access to.

References

External links
Broadwell and Vernon Loeb discussing All In at Politics and Prose bookstore, February 6, 2012

2012 non-fiction books
American biographies
Petraeus scandal
Non-fiction books about the United States Army
War in Afghanistan (2001–2021) books
Penguin Press books